The Invasion of Portugal may refer to several invasions of Portugal including one of the following events:

Spanish invasion of Portugal during the War of the Portuguese Succession (1580) 
 Spanish invasion of Portugal (1762), part of the Seven Years' War
 1801 Invasion of Portugal by Spanish forces in the War of the Oranges
 Invasion of Portugal (1807), by Spanish and French forces as part of the Peninsular War
Portuguese colonization of the Americas